Shutdown or shut down may refer to:

 Government shutdowns in the United States
 Shutdown (computing)
 Shutdown (economics)
 Shutdown (nuclear reactor)

Arts and entertainment

Music
 "Shut Down" (The Beach Boys song), 1963
 Shut Down Volume 2, a 1964 album by the Beach Boys, and "Shut Down, Part II", a track on the album
 Shut Down (album), a multi-artist compilation album of 1963 with hot rod music
 "Shut Down" (Australian Crawl song), 1982
 "Shutdown" (Skepta song), 2015
 "Shut Down" (Blackpink song), a song by Blackpink from their 2022 album Born Pink
 "Shut Down", a song by Soul Asylum from the 1995 album Let Your Dim Light Shine
 "Shutdown", a song by Pitchshifter from the 2002 album PSI

Television
 "Shut Down" (Prison Break), an episode of the TV series
 "Shutdown" (Good Girls), an episode of the TV series
 "Shutdown", an episode of The West Wing (season 5)

See also
 
 
 General strike
 Occupational burnout
 Shut down valve